Lalich is a surname, an anglicized form of Lalić. Notable people with the surname include:

 Janja Lalich (born 1945), American sociologist
 Judd Lalich (born 1975), Australian rules footballer
 Nick Lalich (born 1945), Australian politician
 Pete Lalich (1920–2008), American basketball player
 Roger A. Lalich, American general